Haig-Thomas Island is one of the Sverdrup Islands in Qikiqtaaluk Region, Nunavut, Canada. It is located in Massey Sound, between Amund Ringnes Island and Axel Heiberg Island. It is also a member of the Queen Elizabeth Islands and the Arctic Archipelago. It is named for the British explorer David Haig-Thomas who charted it in 1938.

External links
 Haig-Thomas Island in the Atlas of Canada - Toporama; Natural Resources Canada

Islands of the Queen Elizabeth Islands
Sverdrup Islands
Uninhabited islands of Qikiqtaaluk Region